Bayram Olgun (born 26 April 1990) is a Turkish professional footballer who plays as a goalkeeper for Çorum.

Life and career
Olgun began his career by signing a youth contract with Ankaragücü in 2007. He was loaned to Bugsaş Spor on 20 January 2010, and made his professional debut against Pursaklarspor in a TFF Second League match on 25 April 2010.

References

1990 births
Sportspeople from Van, Turkey
Living people
Turkish footballers
Turkey youth international footballers
Turkey under-21 international footballers
Association football goalkeepers
MKE Ankaragücü footballers
Manisaspor footballers
Menemenspor footballers
Tuzlaspor players
Kocaelispor footballers
Süper Lig players
TFF First League players
TFF Second League players
TFF Third League players